Ksibet El Mediouni is a small city located in the region of the Sahel in Tunisia around 10 km south of Monastir. It is a commune in the Monastir Governorate.

History  

The city origins are thought to be linked to the establishment of an observation post of the Almoravids to control Christian incursion on this part of the Tunisian coast.

Its name is linked to the local saint Mohamed Ben Abd'Allah El Mediouni who may be an Almoravide coming from the village of Mediouna near Casablanca in Morocco.

The city is known for its traditional crafts, especially for its  handmade carpets.

See also 
List of cities in Tunisia

References

External links 

Populated places in Monastir Governorate
Communes of Tunisia